Yenişehir or Yeni Şehir (Turkish for "new city" or "new town"), also spelt as Yeni Shehr may refer to:

Settlements
 Yenişehir, the modern section of Ankara, Turkey
 Yenişehir, Bursa, a district of Bursa Province, Turkey
 Yenişehir, Diyarbakır, a district of the city of Diyarbakır, Diyarbakır Province, Turkey
 Yenişehir, Mersin, a district of Mersin Province, Turkey
 Yenişehir, Nicosia, a suburb of Nicosia, in Northern Cyprus
 Yenişehir, Pendik, a neighborhood of Istanbul, Turkey
 Yenişehir-i Fener, the Ottoman name of the city of Larissa, Greece

Structures
 Yenişehir Airport, an airport in Yenişehir district of Bursa Province, Turkey
 Yenişehir railway station, a TCDD station in Ankara, Turkey
 Yenişehir Stadium, a multi-purpose stadium in Karabük, Turkey
 GSIM Yenişehir Ice Hockey Hall, a venue in Erzurum, Turkey

See also 
 Nevşehir, with an equivalent etymology in Turkish language

Turkish toponyms